A gandharva is a member of a class of celestial beings in Dharmic religions, such as Hinduism, Buddhism, and Jainism, whose males are divine performers such as musicians and singers, and the females are divine dancers. In Hinduism, they are regarded to be the celestial demigods who serve as the musicians of the devas.

It is also a term for skilled singers in Indian classical music.

Gandharvas have been associated with the historical Gandhara region.

In Buddhism, this term also refers to a being in the intermediate state (between death and rebirth).

Hinduism
In Hinduism, the gandharvas are a class of minor deities who serve as divine musicians in Hindu mythology. The term gandharva is present in Vedic sources (including in the Rigveda) as a singular deity. According to Oberlies, "In mandala I, IX and X the gandharva is presented as a celestial being (dwelling near the sun / in the heavenly waters) which watches over the Soma (apparently) for the benefit of the gods and the sacrificers." The gandharva also "receives the Soma from the ‘Daughter of the Sun' to put it into the Soma plant (RV 9.113.3), i.e., to bring it to this world." The gandharva also brings other things from the beyond, including humans (RV 10.10.4) and the horse (RV 1.163.2). As such, the function of the gandharva is "to escort things from ‘outside' into this world thereby divesting them of their (potential) dangerous nature." Later, the figure also came to be associated with fertility and virility.

The Atharvaveda mentions that there are 6333 gandharvas. The female gandharvas are called gandharvis, though gandharvas are generally the husbands of the apsaras. They are described to be handsome beings who wear fragrant attires. Some are part animal, usually a bird or horse. They have exceptional musical skills, and are described to be passionate about women. They guard the sacred Soma drink, and play beautiful music for the devas in their palaces. Gandharvas usually live in Indraloka and serve at Indra's court, though they also have their own realm, called the Gandharvaloka.

In Hindu law, a gandharva marriage is one contracted by mutual consent and without formal rituals.

Gandharvas are mentioned extensively in the epic Mahabharata as associated with the devas (as dancers and singers) and with the yakshas, as formidable warriors. They are mentioned as spread across various territories.Some of the most prominent gandharvas include Tumburu, Visvavasu (who was the father of Pramadvara), Chitrangada (who killed Chitrangada, the son of Shantanu and Satyavati), Chitrasena (with whom the Kauravas and Pandavas fought in the Ghosha-yatra), Drumila (the biological father of Kamsa in some texts), and Candavega (king of gandharvas who invaded the city of Purañjana).

Parentage

Various parentage is given for the gandharvas. They are called the creatures of Prajapati, of Brahma, of Kashyapa and Pradha, of the Munis, of Arishta, or of Vāc.

The Bhagavata Purana mentions that when Brahma, during creation, saw the activities of some sexually active asuras, he laughed. From his laughter were produced the gandharvas.

Buddhism

A gandharva (Sanskrit; Pali: Gandhabba) is one of the lowest-ranking Devas in Buddhist cosmology. They are classed among the Cāturmahārājakāyika Devas, and are subject to the Great King , Guardian of the East. Beings are reborn among the gandharvas as a consequence of having practiced the most basic form of ethics (Janavasabha Sutta, DN.18). 
gandharvas can fly through the air, and are known for their skill as musicians. They are connected with trees and flowers, and are described as dwelling in the scents of bark, sap, and blossoms. They are among the beings of the wilderness that might disturb a monk meditating alone.

The terms  and  sometimes refer to the same entity.  in these cases is the more general term, including a variety of lower deities.

Intermediate Rebirth
In the Mahātaṇhāsankhaya Sutta of the Majjhima Nikāya, the Buddha explains to the bhikkhus that an embryo develops when three conditions are met: the woman must be in the correct point of her menstrual cycle, the woman and man must have sexual intercourse, and a gandhabba must be present. According to the commentary of this sutta, the use of the word gandhabba doesn't refer to a celestial Deva, but a being enabled to be born by its karma. It is the state of a sentient being between rebirths.

Notable gandharvas
Among the notable gandharvas mentioned (in DN.20 and DN.32) are Panāda, Opamañña, Nala, Cittasena, Mātali, and Janesabha. The last in this list is thought to be synonymous with Janavasabha, a rebirth of King Bimbisāra of Magadha.  Mātali is the charioteer of Śakra.

Timbarū is a chieftain of the gandharvas. There is a romantic story told about the love between his daughter Bhaddā Suriyavacchasā and another gandharva, Pañcasikha. Pañcasikha fell in love with Suriyavacchasā when he saw her dancing before Śakra, but she was then in love with Mātali's son Sikhandī (or Sikhaddi). Pañcasikha went to Timbarū's home and played a melody on his flute of beluva-wood, with which he had great skill, and sang a love song in which he interwove themes about the Buddha and the Arhats.

Śakra petitioned Pañcasikha to intercede with the Buddha so that he might have an audience with him. As a reward for Pañcasikha's services, Śakra was able to get Suriyavacchasā, already pleased with Pañcasikha's display of skill and devotion, to agree to marry Pañcasikha.

Pañcasikha also acts as a messenger for the Four Heavenly Kings, conveying news from them to Mātali, the latter representing Śakra and the  Devas.

Jainism
In Jainism, gandharvas are classed among the eight Vyantara Devas.

The Tiloyapaṇṇatti provides a list of ten gandharvas:

Hāhā
Huhū
Nārada
Tumbara
Vāsava
Kadamba
Mahāsvara
Gītarati
Gītarasa
Vajravān

The Saṃgrahaṇī Sūtra of the Śvetāmbara sect provides a slightly different list:

Hāhā
Huhū
Tumburu
Nārada
Ṛṣivādika
Bhūtavādika
Kadamba
Mahākadamba
Raivata
Viśvāvasu
Gītarati
Gītayaśas

The Digambara sect describes the gandharvas as having a golden complexion while the Śvetāmbara tradition recognizes them as blackish. The Tumbaru is their sacred tree.

See also
 List of gandharvas
 Chitrasena
 Tumburu
 Kabandha
 gandharva marriage
 Fairy
 Sylph

References

Buddhist deities
Non-human races in Hindu mythology
 
Nature spirits
Types of deities
Avian humanoids